Etanautine, also known as diphenhydramine monoacefyllinate, is an anticholinergic used as an antiparkinsonian agent. It is a 1:1 salt of diphenhydramine with acefylline, similar to the diphenhydramine/8-chlorotheophylline combination product dimenhydrinate.

As with dimenhydrinate, the stimulant effect of the etanautine counteracts the sedative effect from the diphenhydramine, resulting in an improved therapeutic profile.

The 1:2 salt diphenhydramine diacefylline (with two molecules of acefylline to each molecule of diphenhydramine) is also used in medicine, under the brand name Nautamine.

References 

Adenosine receptor antagonists
Antiparkinsonian agents
Ethers
Muscarinic antagonists
Stimulants